Abigail Anne "Abi" Tucker (born 22 January 1973) is an Australian singer-songwriter and actress. She has had roles in television series-telemovies in Heartbreak High (1994-1995), Water Rats (1999), Wildside (1999), The Secret Life of Us (2001-2003), My Husband, my Killer (2001), McLeod's Daughters (2007-2009), Giggle and Hoot (2010) ABC's Playschool (2006-2010); and in films The New Girlfriend (original title: Envy) (1996), Angst (2000) and The Wog Boy (2000). Her theatre credits include The Vagina Monologues (2000), Everything's F***ed workshop (2003), The Music and Lyrics of Sean Peter (2003), Breakfast with Jonny Wilkinson (2005), Poor Boy – Music of Tim Finn (2010) and Bell Shakespeare's As You Like It (2015).

Career
Abigail Anne Tucker came to public attention as a singer on the Australian program, New Faces in the early 1990s and in 1994 landed a role in the Australian TV series Heartbreak High in which she also contributed to the series music soundtrack. Tucker recorded her first EP of original music in 1994 called, 'Breathe In' which was produced by Dorian West and released through Shock Records, before moving to the UK.

During an extended stay in London, Tucker teamed up with musician/songwriter Davi Taylor to form 'grunge rock' band 'Bully'. The pair recorded an unreleased EP of songs at AIR studios with renowned producer, Eric Rosse before relations at EMI records folded and Tucker returned to Australia to work on acclaimed series, Wildside.

Films Angst and The Wog Boy followed, as well as roles in Water Rats, My Husband My Killer and Envy, plus a stage production of The Vagina Monologues, during which time Tucker continued to write and record music. Tucker contributed two tracks to the soundtrack of 'Angst'. She then landed the role of Miranda Lang in the series, The Secret Life of Us and appeared on the music soundtrack with two of her own tracks and another track written by Don Walker which she performed called, "Everybody". During almost three series of The Secret Life of Us, Tucker performed guest vocals on various albums: White Noise by Alpinestars, AM PM by Endorphin, and a remix of her track "Move You" was released by the Wicked Beat Sound System.

She contributed backing vocals to some songs on David McCormack's debut solo album, Candy in 2002. Tucker also wrote the majority of her album, Dreamworld, which was co-produced by producers including Bob Scott, Sean Peter, Daniel Denholm and Phillip Buckle and mixed by Bob Scott. Dreamworld was released in 2003 through Shock Records.

Tucker followed the release by an extensive tour throughout Australia with guitarist / producer Sydney Green.

In 2005, Tucker was offered a role at the Menier Chocolate Factory in London in a play by Chris England called Breakfast with Jonny Wilkinson taking her back to the UK. The play also went to the Edinburgh Festival in 2006.

After landing the role of Grace McLeod in McLeod's Daughters''' in 2007, Tucker moved to Adelaide where she finished writing and recording her second album, One December Moon. She also performed in a number of the songs featured in the series.

In 2008, One December Moon was released through MGM records and Edel Records in Germany, Austria and Switzerland, followed by an Australian tour. Tucker then went back to Europe to perform as support for Melanie Safka throughout Germany on her 'Working Legends' tour.

In 2010, Tucker appeared in the MTC / STC production of Matt Cameron's Poor Boy alongside Guy Pearce (MTC season) and Matt Newton (STC Season). The same year she scored a presenters role on 'ABC's Playschool' and also toured extensively with the show throughout Australia.

In 2012, Tucker briefly puppeteered and voiced the character of Hootabelle on Giggle and Hoot while continuing to write and record material for her third album. 
In 2013, Tucker met guitarist / songwriter Julian Curwin and together they began work on a side project of songs and formed the duo The Falling Seeds.

Tucker performed the roles of Amiens and Audrey in Bell Shakespeare's As You Like It'' in Sydney, Canberra and Melbourne. She returned to Sydney and the Falling Seeds' debut album was launched on 28 May 2015 and released digitally through noisehive.com.

Personal life
Tucker has two daughters, Hazel (2014) and Pepper (2015) with partner Chris Rochester.

Filmography

Discography

Studio albums

Singles

References
 Big Magazine – EMAP early – mid-1990s
  - 'One December Moon' Album interview
  - 'McLeod's Daughters' interview
  - Abi Tucker & Rachael Coopes on the Today Show

External links 
 
 
 

1973 births
Living people
Australian soap opera actresses
Australian children's television presenters
21st-century Australian singers
21st-century Australian women singers
Australian women television presenters